Charles McFarlane Inglis FES, FZS (8 November 1870–13 February 1954) was a naturalist and curator of the Darjeeling museum in India from 1923 to 1948. The museum was run by the Bengal Natural History Society and many of his writings were published in that society's journal which he started and edited.

Inglis was born in Elgin, Scotland, the son of Archibald Inglis, a retired indigo planter in India who went to India at the age of 18. Little is known of Inglis' early life but he gave up an office job in Inverness and moved to India where he worked initially at Roopachera Tea Estate in Hailekandi. He became interested in birds after a collector working for Allan Octavian Hume showed him a specimen of an oriole. He subsequently contacted E C Stuart Baker. In 1898 he became a indigo planter in Baghownie. During this time made studies of birds and collected many specimens of butterflies and dragonflies.<ref name=":0">)</re>Warr, F. E. 1996. Manuscripts and Drawings in the ornithology and Rothschild libraries of The Natural History Museum at Tring. BOC.</ref> In 1923 he took over as curator of the Darjeeling Natural History Museum. He then retired to Coonoor where he died in 1954.

His ability to sketch and illustrate birds led to Thomas Bainbrigge Fletcher inviting him to produce a series of articles on birds of importance to agriculture in India. These were published in the Agricultural Journal of India and were later revised and published as a book Birds of an Indian Garden in 1924.

Inglis shot eight specimens of the pink-headed duck in Bihar from 1903, including the last known specimen collected in June 1935 from Baghownie.

Publications
Baker, H. R. & C. M. Inglis. The Birds of Southern India including Madras, Malabar, Travancore, Cochin, Coorg and Mysore. Government Press, Madras (1930)
Fletcher, T. B. and C. M. Inglis Birds of an Indian Garden. Calcutta & Simla: Thacker, Spink & Co. (1924)
Inglis C. M. The leaf insect – Phyllium scythe Gr. J. Darjeeling Nat Hist. Soc. 5 : 32–33 (1930)

References

External links

British naturalists
Indian naturalists
Fellows of the Zoological Society of London
Indian planters
1870 births
1954 deaths

People from Darjeeling
19th-century Indian biologists
20th-century Indian biologists
Scientists from West Bengal